Juan Ángel Obelar  (born 12 August 1979) is a Uruguayan retired professional footballer who played as a goalkeeper.

Club career
He was born in Mercedes.

Obelar previously played for C.A. Peñarol, Villa Española and Tacuarembó F.C. in the Primera División Uruguaya. He also played for C.D. Marathón of the Liga Nacional de Honduras and Millonarios in the Colombian Primera A.

Obelar won the Honduran league with Marathón in 2008, leading to a move to Millonarios in 2010. He made a promising start with the Bogotá side, but was relegated to the bench midway through the 2010 season after a poor performance against Cortuluá.

In November 2013, Obelar retired from football after losing four fingers of his left hand in a domestic accident involving a wood plane.

References

1979 births
Living people
Uruguayan footballers
Uruguayan expatriate footballers
Peñarol players
Tacuarembó F.C. players
C.D. Marathón players
Millonarios F.C. players
Uruguayan Primera División players
Categoría Primera A players
Liga Nacional de Fútbol Profesional de Honduras players
Expatriate footballers in Honduras
Expatriate footballers in Colombia
Association football goalkeepers